Alling is a municipality in the district of Fürstenfeldbruck, Bavaria, Germany.

References

Fürstenfeldbruck (district)